Hopewell is a set of historic homes and farm complexes located at Union Bridge, Carroll County, Maryland, United States. It consists of four related groupings of 19th century farm buildings. The Hopewell complex consists of two historic farms: Hopewell and the smaller F.R. Shriner (Sam's Creek) Farm.

Hopewell's two-story main house dates from 1818.  It has the distinction of having the first interior bathroom installed in Frederick County outside the City of Frederick.  The main farm also contains a stone dairy, a frame privy, a frame carriage house, a frame workshop, a brick smokehouse, a brick bake oven, an ice house, and a frame Pennsylvania barn. There are two tenant complexes associated with Hopewell.

The F.R. Shriner Farm lies in Carroll County and consists of a brick two-story house on a raised coursed marble foundation, two smokehouses, an outhouse, a Pennsylvania barn, two corrugated iron silos, a double corncrib-wagon shed, two modern feed/storage buildings, a chicken coop, garage, work shed, piggery, and tractor shed.

Hopewell was listed on the National Register of Historic Places in 1980.

References

External links
, including undated photo, at Maryland Historical Trust
Hopewell, Pearre Road, Union Bridge vicinity, Frederick, MD at the Historic American Buildings Survey (HABS)

Houses on the National Register of Historic Places in Maryland
Houses in Carroll County, Maryland
Historic American Buildings Survey in Maryland
Union Bridge, Maryland
National Register of Historic Places in Carroll County, Maryland